The  is a title owned and promoted by the Pro Wrestling Land's End promotion. The title was originally created in 1955 in Japan Wrestling Association (JWA), with the inaugural champion crowned on November 22, 1955. Being a professional wrestling championship, the title is won as a result of a match with a predetermined outcome. The current champion is Kim Nam-seok, who is in his first reign.

History
This title was contested for originally in JWA where it was known as the Pacific Wrestling Federation (PWF) All Asia Heavyweight Championship or All Asia Heavyweight Championship for short. When JWA shut down in 1973, the title went inactive until being reactivated in All Japan Pro Wrestling (AJPW) in 1976 after New Japan Pro-Wrestling (NJPW) announced the creation of its own version of the title. The NJPW title was retired in 1981, while the AJPW title was retired in 1995, following the retirement of final champion Kintaro Ohki.

On December 15, 2017, the Pro Wrestling Land's End promotion announced that it had gotten the blessing of Pacific Wrestling Federation chairman Dory Funk Jr. and Mitsuo Momota, the son of inaugural champion Rikidōzan, to revive the Asia Heavyweight Championship with a tournament to crown the new champion set to take place in South Korea on January 21, 2018. This also led to a new name and a new design of the championship. The tournament was won by Ryoji Sai who defeated Bodyguard in the finals of an eight-man tournament.

Inaugural championship tournament (1955)

Notes

Championship revival tournament (2018)

Reigns

Combined reigns

See also
All Japan Pro Wrestling
Japan Wrestling Association
All Asia Tag Team Championship
IWGP Intercontinental Championship
IWGP United States Championship
PWF Gaora Television Heavyweight Championship
GHC National Championship
United National Heavyweight Championship (Zero1)

References

External links
Wrestling-Titles.com
Land's End official website

All Japan Pro Wrestling championships
Continental professional wrestling championships
Japan Pro Wrestling Alliance championships